Sir Giles Rooke (1743–1808) was an English judge.

Life
The third son of Giles Rooke, a merchant of London and director of the East India Company, by Frances, daughter of Leonard Cropp (1710-1785) of Southampton, he was born on 3 June 1743. He was educated at Harrow School and matriculated at St John's College, Oxford on 26 November 1759, graduating B.A. in 1763. He proceeded M.A. in 1766, and in the same year was elected to a fellowship at Merton College, which he held until 1785.

Rooke was also called to the bar at Lincoln's Inn in 1766, and went the western circuit. In 1781 he was called to the degree of serjeant-at-law, and in April 1793 was made king's serjeant. At the next Exeter assizes he prosecuted to conviction William Winterbotham, a dissenting minister at Plymouth, for preaching sermons of a revolutionary tendency; and on 13 November of the same year was appointed to the puisne judgeship of the Court of Common Pleas, left vacant by the death of John Wilson. At the same time he was knighted. Rooke presided at the trial at the York Lent assizes in 1795 of Henry Redhead Yorke for conspiracy against the government. 

He died on 7 March 1808. Rooke left a large family by his wife, Harriet Sophia Burrard (d. 1839), the sister of Admiral Sir Harry Burrard Neale 2nd Bt., of Walhampton. Lady Rooke was the daughter of Colonel William Burrard of Walhampton, Hampshire; Governor of Yarmouth Castle. The Rookes were the grandparents of the author William Henry Giles Kingston.

Rooke was author of Thoughts on the Propriety of fixing Easter Term, 1792 (anon.)

Notes

External links

Attribution

1743 births
1808 deaths
English barristers
18th-century English judges
Fellows of Merton College, Oxford
Alumni of St John's College, Oxford
Members of Lincoln's Inn
People educated at Harrow School
19th-century English judges